Selee may refer to:

 Selee language, a language of Ghana
 Frank Selee (1859–1909), American baseball manager